The Caritas Hospital is an Indian hospital in Thellakom (near Adichira) under the Ettumanoor municipality in Kottayam district, Kerala, India. The hospital is run by the Syro-Malabar Knanaya Catholic Archeparchy of Kottayam and is a registered hospital. Caritas Hospital has grown from a 50-bed hospital to 635 beds over the years.

History
The Caritas Hospital foundation stone was laid by Cardinal Tiserang in the presence of Mar Thomas Tharayil on November 27, 1953. The roughly six acre site of the hospital was donated by Joseph Vallapally's widow and children. In 1962 Mar Thomas Tharayil, Bishop of Kottayam, in collaboration with a few Germans, started the healthcare venture and named it 'CARITAS'. Spread over 25 acres, 4 kilometres from Government Medical College and seven kilometres from Kottayam.

With the support of the Bishop of Kottayam, the hospital has grown to a world-class manifold academic and community-based hospital that grew from 50 beds to 635 today. The hospital has 33 clinics in the outpatient department and 25 wards in the inpatient department. In addition there is a full-fledged Emergency and Trauma care unit.

Caritas Cancer Institute 
The Caritas Cancer Institute is a comprehensive tertiary cancer Institute with Medical oncology, Surgical oncology and Radiation Oncology and Pain and Palliative Care departments. The Institute was inaugurated on 24 February 2003. The current HOD is Dr. Jose Tom, who was the Principal of multiple medical colleges under Kerala DME; he is a Radiation oncologist.  The centre is equipped with 2 linear accelerators for radiation teletherapy via IMRT. The department is providing Brachytherapy facility also. Other Radiation oncologists at CCI are Dr. Johny Joseph (previously associate professor at MCH), Dr. Judith Aaron and Dr. Jenny Joseph.

Dr. Mary Kalapurakal started the Pain & Palliative Department in Caritas. Dr. Manu John, one of the few Palliative Oncologists in India, also works there as a full-time Consultant.

Medical Oncology department started by famous medical oncologist Dr. V P Gangadharan currently has Dr. Boben Thomas and Dr. Unni. S. Pillai (JIPMER, Pondicherry) as consultants. The department is providing chemotherapy services for solid tumours and haematological malignancies. The department also conducts bone marrow transplant services

Surgical oncology department has two decades of experience in advanced oncological surgeries. The Oncosurgery department is the best surgical oncology department in Kerala. The regular surgeries are breast cancer surgeries and head and neck cancer surgeries. They have a separate division for GI oncology surgeries. Another area of expertise is in Gynecologic Oncology surgeries. Keyhole cancer surgeries are done regularly by the surgical oncologists of the department. Oncology surgeries for cancer of lung and esophagus are done with a good outcome. Hepato biliary oncological surgeries, like whipple resection survival rates are equivalent to international standards.

Dr. Jojo V Joseph, one of the senior most and well known surgical oncologist in South India started the department of Surgical Oncology and continues to head the department for the last two decades. He was actively involved in designing and commissioning the Caritas Cancer Institute.

The Caritas Cancer Institute aims to give holistic support to the patients so they may live and die with dignity.

Caritas Heart Institute 
Caritas Heart Institute was inaugurated and blessed on 24 September 2011. It has South India's First Hybrid CathLab, Two state of the art Operation Theatres, 24 bedded Cardiac Intensive Care Unit, 14 bedded post-operative ICU, Hi-end Cardiac Catheterization Laboratory & Well equipped 24 hours mobile emergency. The cardiology department at this hospital has completed 25 years of service to the community. The department has earned a great reputation for rendering excellent service in the past with one of the third in the Indian subcontinent. Interventional Cardiologists, American trained Cardiac Surgeon and a Cardiac Anesthesiologist with vast experience have been posted. Facilities for Angioplasty, Bypass surgery, Valve repair, Balloon dilatation of the valves, Valve replacement surgery, Pacemaker Implantation etc. are available in the new complex. In addition to this there is a Research cell in the cardiology department which participates in multiple multi-centre international research studies.

References 
 
 
 

Hospitals in Kerala
Buildings and structures in Kottayam district
1962 establishments in Kerala
Hospitals established in 1962

External links